South Portland, Maine is home to a number of parks and cemeteries:
Bay View Cemetery
Bug Light Park
Calvary Cemetery
Clark's Pond Trail
DiPietro Park
Forest City Cemetery
Hinckley Park: a public park totaling , includes two ponds and  walking trail. In 2019, the popular dog walking spot was highlighted for an abundance of animal feces.
Jordan Park
South Portland Municipal Golf Course
Thomas Knight Park
Trout Brook Nature Area
Willard Beach

References

 
South Portland
South Portland